Radhia Cousot (6 August 1947 – 1 May 2014) was a French computer scientist known for inventing abstract interpretation.

Studies 

Radhia Cousot was born on 6 August 1947, in Sakiet Sidi Youssef in Tunisia, where she survived the massacre of the children in her school on February 8, 1958. She then went to the Lycée de jeunes filles at Sousse, the Lycée français at Algiers and then the Polytechnic School of Algiers (where she was ranked 1st and the only woman). She specialized in mathematical optimization and integer linear programming. Supported by a UNESCO fellowship (1972–1975), she obtained a master's degree in Computer Science (Diplôme d'études approfondies (DEA)) at the Joseph Fourier University of Grenoble in 1972.

Career 

Radhia Cousot was appointed Associate research scientist at the IMAG laboratory of the Joseph Fourier University of Grenoble (1975–1979) and, from 1980 on, at the Centre national de la recherche scientifique, as junior research scientist, research scientist, senior research scientist, and senior research scientist emerita at the Computer Science laboratories of the Henri Poincaré University of Nancy (1980–1983), the University of Paris-Sud at Orsay (1984–1988), the École Polytechnique (1989–2008) where from 1991 she headed the research team “Semantics, Proof and Abstract interpretation”, and the École Normale Supérieure (2006–2014).

Scientific achievements 

Together with her husband Patrick, Radhia Cousot is the originator of abstract interpretation, an influential technique in formal methods. Abstract interpretation is based on three main ideas. 
 Any reasoning/proof/static analysis on a computer system refers to a semantics describing, at some level of abstraction,  its possible executions. 
 The reasoning/proof/static analysis should abstract away all semantic properties irrelevant to the reasoning. 
 Because of undecidability, sound, fully automated, and always terminating reasonings on/proofs/static analysis of computer systems must perform mathematical inductions in the abstract and so, can only be approximate (even with finiteness and decidability hypothesis, because of combinatorial explosion beyond tiny systems). 
In her thesis, Radhia Cousot advanced the semantics, proof, and static analysis methods for concurrent and parallel programs.

Radhia Cousot is at the origin of the contacts with Airbus in January 1999 that led to the development of 
Astrée run-time error analyzer from 2001 onwards, a tool for sound static program analysis of embedded
control/command software developed at the École Normale Supérieure and now distributed by AbsInt GmbH, a German software company specialized on static analysis. Astrée is used in the transportation, space, and medical software industries.

Awards 

With Patrick Cousot, she received the ACM SIGPLAN Programming Languages Achievement Award   in 2013 and the IEEE Computer Society Harlan D. Mills award  in 2014 for “the invention of ‘abstract interpretation’, development of tool support, and its practical application”.

Radhia Cousot best young researcher paper award 

Since September 2014, the Radhia Cousot best young researcher paper award is attributed annually by the program chair on behalf of the program committee of the Static Analysis Symposia (SAS).

 2014  (Munich, Germany): Aleksandar Chakarov (University of Colorado, Boulder, CO, USA), Expectation invariants for probabilistic program loops as fixed points (with Sriram Sankaranarayanan), M. Müller-Olm & H. Seidl (Eds.):  SAS 2014,  LNCS 8723, pp. 85–100, Springer
 2015 (Saint Malo, France): Marianna Rapoport (University of Waterloo, Ontario, Canada), Precise Data Flow Analysis in the Presence of Correlated Method Calls, (with Ondrej Lhoták and Frank Tip), S. Blazy & T. Jensen  (Eds.): SAS 2015, LNCS 9291, pp. 54–71, Springer
 2016 (Edinburgh, Scotland): Stefan Schulze Frielinghaus (Technische Universität München, Germany), Enforcing Termination of Interprocedural Analysis, (with Helmut Seidl and Ralf Vogler), Xavier Rival  (Ed.): SAS 2016, LNCS 9837, pp. 447–468, Springer
 2017 (New York, NY, USA): Suvam Mukherjee (Indian Institute of Science, Bangalore, India) and Oded Padon (Tel Aviv University, Israel), Thread-Local Semantics and its Efficient Sequential Abstractions for Race-Free Programs, (with Sharon Shoham, Deepak D'Souza, and Noam Rinetzky), Francesco Ranzato (Ed.): SAS 2017, LNCS 10422, pp 253–276, Springer

Notes

References

External links 
 Radhia Cousot home page at  the École Normale Supérieure
 Short biography
 Radhia Cousot publications at  the École Normale Supérieure
 Radhia Cousot award at  the École Normale Supérieure
 Disparition de Radhia Cousot at the Institut des sciences de l’information et de leurs interactions of the CNRS
 
 

1947 births
2014 deaths
2014 in science
French women computer scientists
Formal methods people
Programming language researchers
Software engineering researchers
Nancy-Université alumni
20th-century French women scientists